Jeanette del Rosario Vega Morales (born 11 October 1957) is a Chilean politician and physician. Between March and August 2022, she served as Chile's Minister of Social Development and Family.
On August 25 of 2022, resigns following a news report that one of her advisers, on her behalf, had contacted a Mapuche indigenous terrorist leader Héctor Llaitul who had called for an armed struggled against the state and who was arrested the day before

References

External links
 

1957 births
Living people
Chilean people
Chilean physicians
University of Chile alumni
University of Illinois alumni
Party for Democracy (Chile) politicians
Government ministers of Chile
Women government ministers of Chile